The Galeries Ontario / Ontario Galleries (GOG), formerly Ontario Association of Art Galleries / Association Ontarienne des Galeries d’Art (OAAG/AOGA), was established in 1968 to encourage development of public art galleries, art museums, community galleries and related visual arts organizations in Ontario, Canada. It was incorporated in Ontario in 1970, and registered as a charitable organization. It is a successor organization to the Southern Ontario Gallery Group founded in 1947, renamed the Art Institute of Ontario in 1952. In December of 2020 Ontario Association of Art Galleries / Association Ontarienne des Galeries d’Art (OAAG/AOGA) rebranded to the name Galeries Ontario / Ontario Galleries (GOG) which included new brand identity, logo, and website to better serve art organizations in Ontario and Canada.

GOG is an art service organization serving over 270 Public Art Galleries, museums, artist-run-centres, and arts organizations, through advocacy, professional development, and network-building.  GOG fosters a sustainable, healthy, diverse public art gallery sector to further the visual arts as a key component of the cultural life of the province.

Zainub Verjee was appointed as the executive director in 2015.

Board of Directors

Serving to AGM 2020
York Lethbridge - Board President [2017-2020]

Serving to AGM 2021
Dawn Owen - Board Member [2015-2018][2018-2021]
Glen Bloom - Board Member [2018-2021]
Devyani Saltzman - Board Secretary [2018-2021]

Serving to AGM 2022
Christian Bernard Singer - Board Vice-President [2016-2019][2019-2022]
Robert Steven - Board Treasurer [2016-2019][2019-2022]

Serving to AGM 2022
Shelley Falconer - Board Member [2019-2022]
Ann MacDonald - Board Member [2019-2022]

Serving to AGM 2023
Nahed Mansour - Board Member [2019-2023]

Ex-Officio
Zainub Verjee

Founding member galleries
There are eleven founding members of the modern organization. The founding members are:
Agnes Etherington Art Centre, Kingston
Art Gallery of Hamilton
Art Gallery of Ontario, Toronto (formerly Art Gallery of Toronto)
Justina M. Barnicke Gallery (formerly Hart House), University of Toronto
Kitchener/Waterloo Art Gallery
London Regional and Historical Museums (London Public Library and Art Museum)
National Gallery of Canada, Ottawa
Royal Ontario Museum, Toronto
Sarnia Public Library and Art Gallery
Rodman Hall Art Centre (formerly St. Catharines and District Arts Council)
Art Gallery of Windsor (formerly Willistead Art Gallery

Services

Advocacy

GOG’s advocacy initiatives are a pillar of their service to the sector. These services include lobbying, outreach and education, among others. The organization works on behalf of public art galleries, and the cultural sector in Canada as a whole, to  increase public awareness of issues affecting the visual arts and culture sectors in Ontario and Canada.

Professional Development

GOG produces professional development opportunities designed to increase the capacity of their members to navigate and advance in the cultural sector, taking the form of workshops, think tanks, symposiums and other initiatives. These professional development opportunities cover a wide range of relevant topics, including emerging technologies, new ways of working, accessibility, strategy, and engagement. The programmes are mainly tailored for emerging to senior-level arts professionals working in Ontario's public art galleries, but are often applicable to arts professionals across the board. GOG’s membership program and various initiatives also serve as tools for network building to strengthen the body of public galleries across Ontario.

Awards

The Galeries Ontario / Ontario Galleries Awards program is one of the most comprehensive and established among Ontario's sectoral arts awards programs and was first established in 1978. They are also the only annual juried awards to recognize excellence and significant achievement in programming and partnerships within the Ontario public art gallery sector and, in doing so, advance, empower, and strengthen Canada's visual arts sector. 

The Awards recognize new exhibitions, publications, programs and community engagements that have been produced and commissioned by Ontario's public galleries throughout the past year. In 2019 GOG introduced the Changemaker BIPOC Award. This Award celebrates the diverse and innovative arts practices of Black, Indigenous, People of Colour leaders, which are essential to the country's cultural vitality. GOG acknowledges that historic and systemic barriers have affected access to opportunities and resources for BIPOC arts professionals. This has led to marginalization and inequities for artists and arts leaders in presenting and practicing their work within public art galleries in Ontario.
There are twelve award categories for artistic merit and excellence: 

Exhibition (subdivided by cost) 
Curatorial writing 
Art writing 
Public program
Education
Art publication
Design
Partnership
Lifetime achievement
Colleague 
Volunteer

Membership

Most member galleries participate in a reciprocal admissions program, where membership of one gallery gives admission to the others. The organization provides a liaison between galleries and the Ontario Arts Council.

Members can join as an institution (public art galleries or affiliate organizations), individual (someone who works in an art gallery, or a student) or business (commercial galleries or other for-profit groups).

GOG's membership consists of over 270 art museums, public art galleries, artist-run centres, visual arts organizations, professional colleagues, and friends across Ontario, including: 

A Space Gallery, Toronto
Agnes Etherington Art Centre, Kingston
Agnes Jamieson Gallery, Minden
Art Gallery of Algoma, Sault Ste. Marie
Art Gallery of Burlington
Art Gallery of Guelph
Art Gallery of Hamilton
Art Gallery of Mississauga
Art Gallery of Northumberland, Cobourg
Art Gallery of Ontario, Toronto
Art Gallery of Peterborough
Art Gallery of Sudbury / Galerie d'art de Sudbury
Art Gallery of Windsor
Art Gallery of York University, Toronto
 Art Museum, at the University of Toronto
Bata Shoe Museum, Toronto
 Belleville Public Library and Art Gallery
Blackwood Gallery, at the University of Toronto Mississauga
Cambridge Galleries
Campus Gallery: Georgian College, Barrie
Canadian Clay and Glass Gallery, Waterloo
Carleton University Art Gallery, Ottawa
Craft Ontario, Toronto
Design Exchange, Toronto
 Doris McCarthy Gallery at the University of Toronto Scarborough
Durham Art Gallery, Durham, West Grey
Durham West Arts Centre, Ajax 
Etobicoke Civic Centre Art Gallery, Toronto 
Gallery 1313, Queen Street West, Toronto
 Gallery 44 Centre for Contemporary Photography, Toronto
Gallery Arcturus, Garden District, Toronto
Gallery in the Grove, Bright's Grove
Gallery Stratford
 Gallery TPW, Toronto
Gardiner Museum of Ceramic Art, Toronto
Gibson Gallery, Fort Malden Guild of Arts and Crafts, Amherstburg
Glenhyrst Art Gallery of Brant, Brantford
Grimsby Public Art Gallery
Haliburton Sculpture Forest, Haliburton
Harboufront Centre, Toronto
Homer Watson House & Gallery, Kitchener
Humber Galleries and Collection, Toronto
 John B. Aird Gallery, Mowat Block, Toronto
 Judith & Norman Alix Art Gallery, Sarnia
 Kitchener-Waterloo Art Gallery
Koffler Gallery, Toronto 
Kawartha Art Gallery, Lindsay, Ontario
Latcham Art Centre, Stouffville
 Leamington Arts Centre
Living Arts Centre, Mississauga
MacLaren Art Centre, Barrie
Market Gallery, Toronto
McIntosh Gallery at The University of Western Ontario, London
McMaster Museum of Art, Hamilton
McMichael Canadian Art Collection, Kleinburg
Mercer Union, A Centre for Contemporary Art, Toronto
Museum London
Museum of Contemporary Art, Toronto
National Gallery of Canada, Ottawa
Neilson Park Creative Centre, Toronto
Niagara Falls Art Gallery
 Niagara Pumphouse Visual Arts Centre, Niagara-on-the-Lake
Norfolk Arts Centre, Simcoe
Oakville Galleries
 Open Studio, Toronto
Orillia Museum of Art & History
The Ottawa Art Gallery / La Galerie d'art d'Ottawa
Peel Art Museum and Archives, Brampton
Penetanguishene Centennial Museum & Archives
Power Plant Contemporary Art Centre at Harbourfront Centre, Toronto
Prefix Institute of Contemporary Art, Toronto
Rails End Gallery, Haliburton
Registered Graphic Designers of Ontario, Toronto
RiverBrink Art Museum, Queenston
Robert Langen Art Gallery at Wilfrid Laurier University, Waterloo
The Robert McLaughlin Gallery, Oshawa
Rodman Hall Art Centre, Brock University, St. Catharines
Rotunda Gallery Kitchener City Hall
St. Thomas-Elgin Public Art Centre, St. Thomas
Station Gallery, Whitby
Stephen Bulger Gallery, Toronto
Sur Gallery, Toronto
Temiskaming Art Gallery, Haileybury
TD Gallery, Toronto Reference Library, Toronto
Textile Museum of Canada, Toronto
Thames Art Gallery, Chatham
Thunder Bay Art Gallery
Timmins Museum: National Exhibition Centre, South Porcupine
Tom Thomson Art Gallery, Owen Sound
University of Waterloo Art Gallery, Waterloo 
Varley Art Gallery, Markham
Visual Arts Centre of Clarington, Bowmanville
WKP Kennedy Gallery, North Bay
Woodland Cultural Centre, Brantford
Woodstock Art Gallery 
Ydessa Hendeles Art Foundation, Toronto

Selected publications

"Seminar and conservation survey" Roche, Roger. 1972

References

Culture of Ontario
Organizations based in Ontario
 Art
Organizations established in 1968
1968 establishments in Ontario